The Selma Lagerlöf Prize is a Swedish literary prize awarded to an author writing in the spirit of Selma Lagerlöf who was the first woman to win the Nobel Prize in Literature.  The prize was founded by the Sunne Municipality in 1983 and has been awarded annually since 1984. Recipients receive 100,000 Swedish kronor. The awards ceremony takes place in Sunne every August 13 and is in honor of Selma Lagerlöf.

List of recipients
1984 – Birgitta Trotzig
1985 – Sara Lidman
1986 – Astrid Lindgren
1987 – Göran Tunström
1988 – Lars Ahlin
1989 – Kerstin Ekman
1990 – Lars Andersson
1991 – Lars Gyllensten
1992 – Tove Jansson
1993 – Georg Henrik von Wright
1994 – Stig Claesson
1995 – Ulla Isaksson
1996 – Rolf Edberg
1997 – Per Olov Enquist
1998 – Göran Palm
1999 – Kristina Lugn
2000 – Torgny Lindgren
2001 – Agneta Pleijel
2002 – Peter Englund
2003 – P. C. Jersild
2004 – Sigrid Combüchen
2005 – Birgitta Stenberg
2006 – Lars Jakobson
2007 – Barbro Lindgren
2008 – John Ajvide Lindqvist
2009 – Lars Gustafsson
2010 – Jan Lööf
2011 – Ellen Mattson
2012 – Klas Östergren
2013 – Kjell Johansson
2014 – Lotta Lotass
2015 – Stewe Claeson
2016 – Sara Stridsberg
2017 – Lars Norén
2018 – Carola Hansson
2019 – Kristina Sandberg
2020 – Monika Fagerholm
2021 – Niklas Rådström
2022 – Inger Edelfeldt

References 
 
 

Awards established in 1983
Selma Lagerlöf
Swedish literary awards